Günthersdorf is a village and a former municipality in the district Saalekreis, in Saxony-Anhalt, Germany. Since 31 December 2009, it is part of the town Leuna.

Economy
The town is the site of a large shopping mall and an IKEA furniture store.

Former municipalities in Saxony-Anhalt
Leuna